Zhang Pingwen (born July 1966) is a Chinese mathematician and university administrator, currently serving as president of Wuhan University. He is an academician of the Chinese Academy of Sciences.

Biography
Zhang was born in Changsha County, Hunan, in July 1966. He attended . In 1984, he was accepted to Peking University, where he majored in the Department of Mathematics.

After graduating in 1992, Zhang stayed and worked at Peking University, where he was promoted to associate professor in 1994 and to full professor in 1996. In 2015, he was appointed director of the Discipline Construction Office of Peking University, a post he kept until 2019, when he became director of the Peking University Big Data Science Research Center. He moved up the ranks to become assistant president in August 2019 and vice president in December of that same year.  

On 28 December 2022, the Organization Department of the Chinese Communist Party appointed Zhang as president of Wuhan University, a position at vice-ministerial level.

Honours and awards
 1999 
 2014 State Natural Science Award (Second Class)
 2015 Member of the Chinese Academy of Sciences (CAS)
 November 2016 Fellow of The World Academy of Sciences (TWAS)
 2020 Fellow of the Society for Industrial and Applied Mathematics (SIAM)
 2021 Science and Technology Progress Award of the Ho Leung Ho Lee Foundation

References

1966 births
Living people
People from Changsha County
Scientists from Hunan
Chinese mathematicians
Peking University alumni
Academic staff of Peking University
Presidents of Wuhan University
Members of the Chinese Academy of Engineering
TWAS fellows
Fellows of the Society for Industrial and Applied Mathematics